Ida Clyde Clarke, nee Gallaher (1878-1956) was an American journalist, writer and suffragist. "She was a prolific and multi-faceted writer, producing works of both fiction and non-fiction studies of community organization and feminism".

Life
In 1920 she founded a monthly magazine The Independent Woman, editing it until 1921.

As contributing editor to Pictorial Review, she founded a $5,000 annual award for woman of achievement.

In 1932 her son, Haden Clarke, was a ghostwriter engaged to write the memoirs of the aviatrix Jessie Miller. After a relationship ensued between Clarke and Miller, Haden Clarke was killed by a gunshot wound to the head. The gun belonged to Miller's partner Bill Lancaster, who also admitted forging suicide notes, but Lancaster was acquitted of murder charges.

Works
 All about Nashville, a complete historical guide book to the city, 1912
 Record no. 33, 1915
 American women and the world war, 1918
 The little democracy: a text-book on community organization, 1918.
 (ed.) Women of 1923, International, 1923. (Subsequent editions appeared in 1924, 1925 and 1928.)
 Uncle Sam needs a wife, 1925
 (with A. O Bowden) Tomorrow's Americans: a practical study in student self-government, 1930
 Men that wouldn't stay dead: twenty-six authentic ghost stories, 1936

References

External links
 My Suffrage Creed by Ida Clyde Clarke
 American Women and the World War by Ida Clyde Clarke

1878 births
1956 deaths
American women journalists
20th-century American non-fiction writers
20th-century American women writers
People from Meridian, Mississippi
Writers from Mississippi